Dicliptera maclearii  is a species of plant in the family Acanthaceae which is endemic to Christmas Island, an Australian territory in the north-eastern Indian Ocean.  Its specific epithet honours John Maclear, captain of the survey vessel HMS Flying Fish, which visited Christmas Island in 1886.

Description
Dicliptera maclearii is an erect herb with small pink flowers growing to 1 m in height.  Its leaves are lanceolate to ovate, acuminate or spine-tipped, 20–70 mm long and 5–30 mm wide.  It closest relative is D. ciliata.

Distribution and habitat
Found only on Christmas Island, it is common in places on the lower terraces of the island, including at Flying Fish Cove and North West Point.

References

Notes

Sources
 
 

Acanthaceae
Endemic flora of Christmas Island
Lamiales of Australia
Plants described in 1890
Taxa named by William Hemsley (botanist)